Treat Conrad Huey and Simone Vagnozzi were the defending champions but Huey decided not to participate.
Vagnozzi played alongside Daniel Muñoz de la Nava.
Adrián Menéndez and Jaroslav Pospíšil won the title after defeating Gerard Granollers and Iván Navarro 6–3, 3–6, [10–8] in the final.

Seeds

Draw

Draw

References
 Main draw

2012 Doubles
Meknes Doubles